Marie Dubois (born Claudine Lucie Pauline Huzé; 12 January 1937 – 15 October 2014) was a Parisian-born French actress.

Career
She studied at l'École de la rue Blanche (ENSATT) and made her film debut in 1959, first gaining notice the next year as Léna in Shoot the Piano Player. She then played mainly supporting roles. In the 1960s she appeared in New Wave films such as Jules and Jim and The Thief of Paris, thrillers like Hot Line, and comedies like La Ronde, La Grande Vadrouille, and Monte Carlo or Bust. 

Other film appearances by Dubois during the 1970s include L'Innocente, The Surveyors, Vincent, François, Paul et les autres, Night Flight from Moscow and La Menace. In 1978 she won the César Award for Best Supporting Actress for her role as Dominique Montlaur in La Menace. In the 1980s she appeared in Mon oncle d'Amérique, La Petite Sirène, Une femme en fuite, Garçon! and Descente aux enfers (for which she received a second César nomination for Best Supporting Actress in 1987 for her role as Lucette Beulemans).

Personal life
Dubois married French film actor Serge Rousseau in 1961. They remained together until his death in 2007. The couple had a daughter, actress Dominique Rousseau. Marie Dubois died on 15 October 2014, aged 77, in Lescar, following a long battle with multiple sclerosis.

Filmography

1960: Tirez sur le pianiste (Shoot the Piano Player) (directed by François Truffaut) - Lena
1961: Une femme est une femme (A Woman Is a Woman) (directed by Jean-Luc Godard) - Une amie d'Angela (uncredited)
1961: Le Monocle noir (directed by Georges Lautner) - Bénédicte de Villemaur
1962: Jules and Jim (Jules and Jim) (directed by François Truffaut) - Thérèse
1962: Le Signe du lion (directed by Éric Rohmer) - la femme du café (uncredited)
1962: La Croix des vivants (directed by Ivan Govar) - Gisèle
1962: L'Anglaise (directed by Artur Ramos)
1963: Jusqu'au bout du monde (directed by François Villiers)
1964: La Chasse à l'homme (directed by Édouard Molinaro) - Sophie
1964: La Ronde (Circle of Love) (directed by Roger Vadim) - la fille
1964: Week-end à Zuydcoote (Weekend at Dunkirk) (directed by Henri Verneuil) - Hélène
1964: That Tender Age (directed by Gilles Grangier) - Marie Malhouin
1964: Mata Hari, agent H21 (directed by Jean-Louis Richard) - la jeune fille (uncredited)
1965: Les Grandes Gueules (The Wise Guys) (directed by Robert Enrico) - Jackie Keller
1965: The Lace Wars (directed by René Clair) - Divine
1966: Le Dix-Septième Ciel (directed by Serge Korber) - Marie
1966: La Grande Vadrouille (directed by Gérard Oury) - Juliette
1967: Le Voleur (The Thief of Paris) (directed by Louis Malle) - Geneviève Delpiels
1968: Ce sacré grand-père (directed by Jacques Poitrenaud) - Marie
1968: Le Rouble à deux faces (directed by Étienne Périer) - Natasha
1968: Le Cascadeur (Stuntman) (directed by Marcello Baldi) - Yvette
1969: Monte Carlo or Bust! (directed by Ken Annakin) - Pascale
1970:  (directed by Jacques Doniol-Valcroze) - Isabelle Durras
1971: Bof… Anatomie d'un livreur (directed by Claude Faraldo)
1972: L'Œuf (after Félicien Marceau) (directed by Jean Herman) - Hortense Berthoullet
1972: Les Arpenteurs (The Surveyors) (directed by Michel Soutter) - Alice
1973: Le Serpent (Night Flight from Moscow) (directed by Henri Verneuil) - Mrs. Walter
1973: Antoine and Sebastian (directed by Jean-Marie Périer) - Corinne
1974: L'Escapade (directed by Michel Soutter) - Anne
1974: Vincent, François, Paul et les autres (directed by Claude Sautet) - Lucie
1976: Les Mal Partis (directed by Sébastien Japrisot) - la mère supérieure
1976: Du bout des lèvres (directed by Jean-Marie Degèsves) - Catherine
1976: The Innocent (directed by Luchino Visconti) - The princess
1976: Nuit d'or (Golden Night) (directed by Serge Moati) - Véronique
1977: La Menace (directed by Alain Corneau) - Dominique Montlaur
1979: Je vous ferai aimer la vie (directed by Serge Korber) - Anielle Doucet
1979: Il y a longtemps que je t'aime (directed by Jean-Charles Tacchella) - Brigitte Dupuis
1979: Je parle d'amour (directed by Madeleine Hartmann-Clausset) - Marie
1980: Mon oncle d'Amérique (directed by Alain Resnais) - Thérèse Ragueneau
1980: La Petite Sirène (directed by Roger Andrieux) - Bénédicte Pélissier
1982: Une femme en fuite (directed by Maurice Rabinowicz) - Mona
1983: L'Ami de Vincent (directed by Pierre Granier-Deferre) - Marion
1983: Garçon! (directed by Claude Sautet) - Marie-Pierre
1983: Si j'avais mille ans (directed by Monique Enckell)
1984: L'Intrus (directed by Irène Jouannet) - Anne
1986: Descente aux enfers (directed by Francis Girod) - Lucette Beulemans
1987: Grand Guignol (directed by Jean Marbœuf) - Germaine
1990: Un jeu d'enfant (directed by Pascal Kané) - Noémie
1991: Les Enfants du vent (directed by Krzystof Rogulski) - La femme du maire
1991: La Dernière Saison (directed by Pierre Beccu) - Marthe
1996: Confidences à un inconnu (directed by Georges Bardawil) - La mère
1996: Les Caprices d'un fleuve (directed by Bernard Giraudeau) - La vieille Duchesse
1997: Rien ne va plus (The Swindle) (directed by Claude Chabrol) - Dedette
1999: À vot'service (directed by Eric Bartonio) - Grâce, "la dame-pipi" (segment "Jour de grâce, Le")

References

External links

 
 

Actresses from Paris
French film actresses
French television actresses
20th-century French actresses
Best Supporting Actress César Award winners
Neurological disease deaths in France
Deaths from multiple sclerosis
1937 births
2014 deaths